Latoya is a feminine given name. Other variations of Latoya include Letoya.  In  It is considered to be an African-American name in the United States.

People with the given name Latoya
LaToya London (born 1978), American R&B singer and former contestant on American Idol
LaToya Cantrell (born 1972), American politician elected Mayor of New Orleans in 2017
LaToya Thomas (born 1981), American professional basketball player with the WNBA 
La Toya Jackson (born 1956), American singer and member of the famous Jackson family 
LaToya Rodriguez (born 1983), American R&B singer
LaToyia Figueroa (1981–2005), American murder victim from Philadelphia 
LeToya Luckett (born 1981), American singer and former member of Destiny's Child
Kamara Latoya James (1984-2014), Olympic fencer
Nadja LaToya Benaissa (born 1982), German singer and former member of No Angels
Latoyah Renee Jean Bentley (born 1989), English entrepreneur

See also

LaTonya, given name

References

Feminine given names
African-American given names

de:La Toya